Vingtaine des Augerez is one of the five vingtaines of St Peter Parish on the Channel Island of Jersey.

References

Augerez
Augerez
Jersey articles needing attention